Bolshemurtinsky District is an administrative and municipal district (raion), one of the forty-three in Krasnoyarsk Krai, Russia. It is located in the southern central part of the krai and borders with Kazachinsky District in the north, Taseyevsky District in the east, Sukhobuzimsky and Yemelyanovsky Districts in the south, Birilyussky District in the west, and with Pirovsky District in the northwest. Its administrative center is the urban locality (an urban-type settlement) of Bolshaya Murta. Population:  21,087 (2002 Census);  The population of Bolshaya Murta accounts for 41.4% of the district's total population.

Geography
The district is located in the forest steppe and subtaiga natural climatic zones.

History
The district was founded on April 4, 1924.

Government
As of 2013, the Head of the District and the Chairman of the District Council is Valery V. Verner.

Economy

Transportation

References

Notes

Sources

Districts of Krasnoyarsk Krai
States and territories established in 1924